Alescia Nicole Knowles-Smith (born September 29, 1983), who goes by the stage name Lisa Knowles-Smith, is an American gospel musician. She started her music career, in 1996. They returned with the release of, Experience the Evolution, that was released independently and topped Billboard's Top Gospel Albums Chart.  The second album, The Evolution Continues, released in 2014 by One Voice Media. This album would chart on two Billboard charts the Gospel Albums chart, and the Independent Albums chart.

Early life
Knowles was born on September 29, 1983, in Memphis, Tennessee, as Alescia Nicole Knowles.

Music career
Her music career got started in 1996, in a group with her mother, grandmother, and cousins. This album that was released independently  She released her second album, The Evolution Continues, on March 10, 2014, by One Voice Media. This was her breakthrough released on the Billboard charts, and it placed at No. 6 on the Gospel Albums chart along with at No. 40 on the Independent Albums chart. She is nominated at the 30th Stellar Awards in the following categories: Traditional Group/Duo of the Year, Traditional Female Vocalist of the Year, and Quartet of the Year. She wins Traditional Group/Duo of the Year, and Quartet of The Year.

Discography

References

External links
 Official website

1983 births
Living people
African-American songwriters
African-American Christians
Musicians from Memphis, Tennessee
Songwriters from Tennessee
21st-century African-American people
20th-century African-American people